Tavrichesky District is an administrative and municipal district (raion), one of the thirty-two in Omsk Oblast, Russia. It is located in the south of the oblast. Its administrative center is the urban locality (a work settlement) of Tavricheskoye. Population: 36,458 (2010 Census);  The population of Tavricheskoye accounts for 36.0% of the district's total population.

Notable residents 

Ilya Berkovsky (born 2000), football player, born in Tavricheskoye
Ivan Yagan (1934–2022), writer, born in Baydakovka

References

Notes

Sources

Districts of Omsk Oblast